Frédérique Émilie Auguste O'Connell, whose name at birth was Emilie Friederike Auguste Miethe, was born in Potsdam on 28 March 1822 and died in Paris in 1885. A German painter and portraitist, her work was in vogue among the Parisian social set of the Second Empire. Her works of engraving, rare and limited in number, were prized by the critics of the era. Nonetheless, she died forgotten as an artist.

Madame O'Connell is mentioned in the memoir of Irish pastel portraitist Henriett Corkran (1841/2- 1911) who recalled that O'Connell lived and worked in La Place Vintimille, in Paris. Miss Corkran, who wished to become one of O'Connell's pupils, described her as having a 'plain countenance ... redeemed by wonderful dark eyes, full of fire and intelligence'. Among the paintings Corkran observed in Madame O'Connell's studio were portraits of poet Théophile Gautier, author Alexandre Dumas and the social reformer le Père Enfantin. Corkran further recalls that O'Connell was 'interested in the rights of humanity, the liberty of women.

Notes and references

1822 births
1885 deaths
Romanticism
German women painters
19th-century German women artists